Todd Demsey (born May 27, 1972) is an American professional golfer on the PGA Tour and 1993 NCAA champion.

College career
Demsey was born in Ridgewood, New Jersey. He graduated from Arizona State University in 1995 with a degree in Psychology and turned professional.  He earned All-American honors four years in a row while in college, from 1992 to 1995, and was on the winning American 1993 Walker Cup team. Demsey's college roommate was PGA Tour pro Phil Mickelson. He was inducted into the ASU Sports Hall of Fame in 2006.

Professional career
Demsey played on the PGA Tour in 1997, when he made the cut in only nine of 27 events as a rookie. Back injuries slowed his career on the Nationwide Tour, but the real jolt came in 2002 when he felt constant pressure in his left sinus. At the end of the year, doctors found a tumor, a fifth nerve schwannoma, behind his left sinus going into his brain. He has had two surgeries to remove the tumor.

In 2007, Demsey closed with an 8-under 64 in the sixth and final round of Q-school to earn a full-exempt card for the 2008 PGA Tour season.

Amateur wins (3)
this list may be incomplete
1993 NCAA Division I Championship, Pacific Coast Amateur
1992 California State Amateur

Professional wins (3)
1998 California State Open, Utah Open, Arizona Open

Results in major championships

Note: Demsey only played in the U.S. Open.
CUT = missed the half-way cut

U.S. national team appearances
Amateur
Walker Cup: 1993 (winners)
Eisenhower Trophy: 1994 (winners)

See also
1996 PGA Tour Qualifying School graduates
2007 PGA Tour Qualifying School graduates

References

External links

American male golfers
Arizona State Sun Devils men's golfers
PGA Tour golfers
Golfers from New Jersey
People from Ridgewood, New Jersey
Sportspeople from Bergen County, New Jersey
1972 births
Living people